The following are the football (soccer) events of the year 1928 throughout the world.

Events
 29 August – Honduran club C.D. Motagua was established.

Winners club national championship 

 Argentina: Huracán
 Belgium: R. Antwerp F.C.
 Denmark: B93
 England: Everton F.C.
 Greece: Aris Thessaloniki F.C.
 Iceland: KR
 Italy: Torino F.C.
 Kingdom of Serbs, Croats and Slovenes: Građanski Zagreb
 Netherlands: Feyenoord Rotterdam
 Paraguay: Olimpia Asunción
 Poland: Wisła Kraków
 Scotland:
Division One: Rangers F.C.
Scottish Cup: Rangers F.C.

International tournaments
 1928 British Home Championship (October 22, 1927 – March 31, 1928)

Olympic Games in Amsterdam, Netherlands (May 27 – June 13, 1928)
 
 
 
 Baltic Cup 1928 in Estonia (July 25–27, 1928)

 1924-28 Nordic Football Championship (June 15, 1924 – October 7, 1928) 1928: (June 7 - October 7, 1928)
 (1928)
 (1924-1928)

Births
 January 13 – Bengt Gustavsson, Swedish international footballer and manager (died 2017)
 January 13 – William Martínez, Uruguayan international footballer (died 1997)
 January 25 – Cor van der Hart, Dutch international footballer (died 2006)
 February 23 – André Strappe, French international footballer (died 2006)
 February 29 – Gustau Biosca, Spanish international footballer and manager (died 2014)
 March 12 – Gerhard Harpers, German international footballer (died 2016)
 March 19 – Åke Johansson, Swedish international footballer (died 2014)
 May 29 – Harald Hennum, Norwegian international footballer (died 1993)
 July 1 – Karim Allawi Homaidi, Iraqi footballer
 July 11 – Marcos Calderón, Peruvian football coach (died 1987)
 July 22 – Jimmy Hill, English footballer and broadcaster (died 2015)
 July 25 – Jimmy Jones, Northern Irish international footballer (died 2014)
 August 14 – Gunnar Andersson, Swedish-born French club player (died 1969)
 September 9 – Fritz Herkenrath, German international goalkeeper (died 2016)
 September 23 – Santiago Vernazza, Argentine footballer (died 2017)
 September 29 – Mihály Lantos, Hungarian international footballer and manager (died 1989)
 October 8: Didi, Brazilian international footballer (died 2001)
 October 19 – Mustapha Zitouni, French-Algerian international footballer (died 2014)
 October 28 – Lawrie Reilly, Scottish international footballer (died 2014)
 October 30 – Raúl Cárdenas, Mexican international footballer (died 2016)
 November 26 –  Károly Sándor, Hungarian international footballer (died 2014)

Deaths

References 

 
Association football by year